The Great Pacific Ocean is the second EP by Canadian rock band Thrush Hermit, released in 1995 on CD and 12" picture disc by Murderecords.  The EP was recorded and mixed by Steve Albini.

Track listing
 "The Great Pacific Ocean"
 "Every Morning I Reread the Postcards"
 "25 All Right"
 "Patriot"
 "Claim to Lame"
 "The Great Pacific Ocean (Reprise)"

1995 EPs
Thrush Hermit albums
Albums produced by Steve Albini
Murderecords albums